Knut Alfred Johansson (2 April 1918 – 2 March 2001) was a Swedish footballer who played for Elfsborg and Helsingborg. He featured nine times for the Sweden national football team between 1939 and 1943, scoring eight goals.

Career statistics

Club

Notes

International

International goals
Scores and results list Sweden's goal tally first.

References

1918 births
2001 deaths
Swedish footballers
Sweden international footballers
Association football forwards
Allsvenskan players
IF Elfsborg players
Helsingborgs IF players
People from Borås Municipality
Sportspeople from Västra Götaland County